Ahsanullah (born 11 May 1997) is an Afghan cricketer. He made his first-class debut for Boost Region in the 2017–18 Ahmad Shah Abdali 4-day Tournament on 1 November 2017.

References

External links
 

1997 births
Living people
Afghan cricketers
Boost Defenders cricketers